Trsťany is a village and municipality in Košice-okolie District in the Kosice Region of eastern Slovakia.

History
In historical records the village was first mentioned in 1288.

Geography
The village lies at an altitude of 250 metres and covers an area of 6.592 km². The municipality has a population of about 245 people.

External links
http://www.statistics.sk/mosmis/eng/run.html

Villages and municipalities in Košice-okolie District